Harry the Husky is a body-suit mascot for the University of Washington, one of two mascots the University's athletic program currently uses. Hendrix the Husky is Harry's brother that lives at UW Tacoma.

History
The mascot was introduced in 1921 and retired three years later when it got lost in Bush Auditorium, and the University adopted the nickname "Huskies."

In 1922, the University began using live sled dogs as its mascots, first a non-hereditary line of Siberian Huskies and, beginning in 1961, a hereditary line of Alaskan Malamutes, which are a different breed of dog from the husky. This makes the University of Washington the only university to have an NCAA team that uses live animal mascots that are different from its official mascot. Due to the size of the animals, difficulties of travel, logistics, and handler schedules, the mascots generally only appear at home football games.

In 1995, officials in the University's athletic department commissioned a costume and held tryouts for the new live mascot. Three student performers were chosen (Lee Harris, Evelyn Ho and Chris MacDonald) and rotated duties to appear as a secondary mascot for use at events at which the live mascot was unable to attend. A contest and public vote two years later named the new mascot "Harry the Husky."
Coincidentally, the mascot had already been referred to by that name during a scene in The 6th Man, a film starring Marlon Wayans about the University of Washington basketball team, that had been released prior to the vote.

In 2010, the University unveiled a new Harry the Husky costume and retired the old one. The new husky made his debut on October 9, 2010.

Additionally, the University has also hosted a long line of Alaskan Malamutes as mascots. The dogs were originally cared for by the Sigma Alpha Epsilon fraternity; this arrangement was followed by a 49-year tradition (1959–2008) of care by the Cross family (a UW professor, followed by his son). The 13 dogs thus far are as follows:
 Frosty I (1922–30)
 Frosty II (1930–36)
 Wasky (1946–47)
 Wasky II (1947–53)
 Ski (1954–57)
 Denali (1958)
 King Chinook (1959–68)
 Regent Denali (1969–80)
 Sundodger Denali (1981–92)
 King Redoubt (1992–97)
 Prince Redoubt (1998)
 Spirit (1999–2008)
 Dubs (2009–2018)
 Dubs II (2018– )

References

Washington Huskies
Pac-12 Conference mascots